Speaker of the Turks and Caicos Islands House of Assembly

Speakers of the Turks and Caicos Islands Legislative Council

Speakers of the Turks and Caicos Islands House of Assembly

References

Sources
Chief Ministers and Premiers

Speakers
Turks and Caicos Islands House of Assembly
Speakers